Indian Hills Community College (IHCC) is a public community college in Iowa with campuses in Ottumwa and Centerville. IHCC serves both traditional residential students and commuter students, primarily from a ten-county area in southeast Iowa as well as portions of northern Missouri. IHCC is accredited by the Higher Learning Commission.

History 
Indian Hills Community College was formed by the consolidation of three previously existing post-secondary education institutions: Iowa Tech-Area XV Community College, Centerville Community College, and Ottumwa Heights College. The first steps toward merger took place on June 3, 1966 under the guidance of the Iowa Board of Public Instruction, with operations beginning on July 1, 1966. At first known as the Iowa Tech Area XV Community College, classes were held at the Ottumwa Regional Airport and consisted of technical programs formerly administrated by the Ottumwa public school district. Centerville Community College was added to the fold on July 1, 1968, with a new 72-acre campus completed in 1970. The merged institutions were renamed Indian Hills Community College in 1970.

Campuses

Ottumwa
The main campus is located in Ottumwa, encompassing all of the former Ottumwa Heights facilities, plus several other buildings added since the consolidation. Included are residential halls, Advance Technology Center, and the Hellyer Student Center, where the IHCC Warriors basketball team play. The second Ottumwa campus, known as North Campus, is based on 270 acres at Ottumwa Regional Airport. This campus is the base for IHCC's aviation programs, commercial driver training, welding technology center and auto collision repair programs. The Job Corps training facility is also located at the IHCC North campus.

Centerville

A third campus is located in Centerville, Iowa. Completed in 1970, the Centerville campus consists of a series of single-story modular buildings connected by walkways. It is located in a rural setting on the west edge of the community. A variety of specialized technology programs as well as general education classes are offered at IHCC -Centerville. The IHCC Falcons, the college's baseball team, practice and play their home games at Pat Daugherty Field on the Centerville campus. In May, 2013 school officials announced a major expansion to IHCC - Centerville's Sustainable agriculture program. Philanthropist and Appanoose County, Iowa native Morgan E. Cline donated $500,000 dollars for the construction of a large greenhouse, learning center, classrooms, and distribution center for the produce grown. The new complex, to be built adjacent to the Centerville IHCC campus, will also offer community outreach events such as tours and continuing education classes in subjects ranging from back yard gardening to food packaging.

Organization and administration 
The college has experienced relatively low turnover in the school administration since its founding. Dr. Mel Everingham, who oversaw the merger of the disparate institutions into IHCC, remained on as the college's first President, serving until 1973. Dr. Lyle Hellyer took over as President in 1973 and over the next twenty-eight years orchestrated considerable growth in campus facilities, student enrollment, and program offerings. He retired in 2001 and the Hellyer Student Life center is named in his honor. In 2001 Dr. Jim Linenmayer was named the third President of IHCC. Linenmayer began his career at Indian Hills in 1980 as a college recruiter. Under his leadership student enrollment increased by 45-percent, the Job Corps center was opened, and new academic programs were introduced. In early May, 2013 Lindenmayer announced his retirement as IHCC President. On May 13, 2013 the IHCC Board of Trustees named Dr. Marlene Sprouse as Lindenmayer's successor. Sprouse, previously the Executive Vice-President for Academic Affairs, becomes the colleges fourth President when Lindenmayer officially steps down in Fall, 2013. She is an IHCC alumnus and previously served as Dean of the IHCC - Centerville campus.

Academics
Indian Hills Community College associate degrees, certificates, and diplomas.

Athletics

Indian Hills participates in the National Junior College Athletic Association in the following sports:

 Women: Cross Country, Golf, Soccer, Softball, Track & Field, Volleyball, Wrestling
 Men: Basketball, Baseball, Cross Country, Golf, Soccer, Track & Field, Wrestling
Coed: Competitive Cheer & Dance, Sports Shooting

The men's basketball team has served as one of the premier junior college programs in the nation over the last three decades. The Warriors are the only program in the nation to win three consecutive NJCAA Division I Men's Basketball National Championships - 1997, 1998, 1999. During that stretch, the Warriors broke UCLA's previous collegiate men's basketball record by winning 89 consecutive games, a feat that stands to this day. The Warriors are tied for eighth all-time with 17 appearances at the historic NJCAA DI Men's Basketball Championship in Hutchinson, KS. The Warriors rank in the top-30 all-time in the NJCAA with over 1,200 wins. Hank Plona has served as the team's head coach since 2015 with five trips to the national tournament. The Warriors have had three players drafted directly from Indian Hills - C.J. Bruton, Cory Hightower, and Ernest Brown while Pete Mickeal and Johnny Taylor were drafted following their collegiate careers. Additional alumni include Nuni Omot, Tyon Grant-Foster, and Drake Jeffries. Indian Hills competes in the historic Hellyer Center where the Warriors have won over .880% of its home games since 1986.

The Warrior softball team began at the Centerville campus in the spring of 1974, but since 1988 has been based in Ottumwa. The program has made 20 appearances in the National Junior College Athletic Association softball tournament. Home games are played at R.L. Hellyer Field, next to their indoor practice facility, funded by and named for IHCC alumnus Tom Arnold. Lindsay Diehl has served as the team's head coach since 2019 and has posted three 40-win seasons.

The Indian Hills Baseball team, formerly known as the Falcons, competes on the Indian Hills Centerville campus at Pat Daugherty Field. The team's indoor multi-purpose facility features a pro-style clubhouse, four indoor batting cages with pitching machines, four indoor mounds, a complete weight room and laundry facilities. The facility added turf during this renovation making it one of the nicest indoor baseball facilities in all of junior college baseball.

Now known as the Warriors, the baseball team has made 12 appearances at the JUCO World Series in Grand Junction, CO. Since the program's inception in 1961, Indian Hills has totaled more than 120 alumni who signed or were drafted to play professional baseball. As of 2022, 10 alumni are either playing or coaching at the professional level. Matthew Torrez serves as the team's head coach as of 2019.

The Warrior golf program, housed on the Ottumwa campus, has claimed six national championships, all coming since 2000 (2000, 2011, 2012, 2014, 2015, 2018). Along with the team national titles, the Warriors have claimed five medalist honors at the national championship - Rick Sanders (2017), Brad Smith (2006), Adam Collins (2003), Pat Stolpe (2001), and Adam Babb (1998). The Warriors have competed in 35 consecutive national tournaments, dating back to the 1987 season. The program is led by head coach Michael Wetrich as of the 2022 season.

In the spring of 2022, Indian Hills Community College announced the addition of women's golf that will begin competition at the NJCAA Division I level beginning in the fall of 2024.

The women's soccer program began in 2007 and competes at the NJCAA Division I level. The Warriors have won at least 10 games in a season every year since 2015, including a program record 18 wins in 2022. The Warriors have claimed six All-American honors since 2017. The Warriors reached their first-ever national tournament in 2021.

The Indian Hills men's soccer program began in 2007 and has gone through periods of success. The Warriors won a program record 18 matches in 2018 and reached the team's first-ever NJCAA Division I National Tournament behind the All-American play of Akean Schackleford. The program is currently led by head coach Kevin Nuss as of the 2021 season.

The Indian Hills Volleyball program began in the 1996 season on the Ottumwa campus and has been a perennial power in the Iowa Community College Athletic Conference. The Warriors have reached three NJCAA Division I National Tournaments, most recently in 2019 under current head coach Lyndsey Michel. Since 1998, the program has claimed 18 individual All-American awards. The Warriors compete in the historic Hellyer Center.

Indian Hills offers men's and women's cross country and track and field that compete at the NJCAA Division I level. The Men's and Women's Cross Country programs were added to the intercollegiate sports offered at Indian Hills Community College in the fall of 2007, providing a means for talented distance runners from Iowa and elsewhere to compete at the college level. It also offers students, who have not run competitively in the past, the opportunity to develop their running abilities and participate in college athletics.

The track and field programs have consistently placed at the NJCAA Indoor and Outdoor National Championships and have claimed five individual national champions, including 2020 Tokyo Olympics Silver Medalist Kenny Bednarek who won three national championships in 2019. On May 17, 2019 at the NJCAA Outdoor National Championships, Bednarek ran the fourth-fastest all-conditions 200-meter dash at the time. The running programs are coached by Brent Ewing.

The men's and women's wrestling programs, currently coached by Cole Spree, are two of the newest intercollegiate offerings at Indian Hills. Both programs began competition in the fall of 2020. In its first two years of existence, the women's programs won both the team and dual Junior College National Championships in back-to-back years in 2021 and 2022 with 25 individual All-Americans and seven individual national champions. The Warriors will begin competing at the NJCAA level beginning in the fall of 2022. The men's program currently competes at the NJCAA level and won the NJCAA North Central District Championship in its first year of competition in the spring of 2021. The Warriors have placed eighth in the 2021 and 2022 NJCAA National Championships and have claimed 10 All-Americans.

The coed Competitive Cheer and Dance program at Indian Hills offers scholarships to student-athletes to compete at the intercollegiate level. The program won the 2022 Small College Co-Ed Intermediate National Championship at the Cheer Ltd. Nationals at CANAM. Coached by Cyndi Mellin, the program also provides cheerleading at home athletic contests, including all home men's basketball games at the historic Hellyer Center.

The Indian Hills Sports Shooting squad competes in the Iowa Community College Athletic Conference and routinely places at the state and national meets under current head coach Jake Stalzer. The program competes at the Appanoose County Shooting Club.

Student life
IHCC offers on-campus student housing at the main Ottumwa campus and the Centerville campus. Both apartment-style and traditional double-occupancy dorm rooms are available. All are non-smoking. Internet, cable television, and telephone service are provided. All dormitories are air-conditioned and laundry facilities are available. A student health and wellness clinic staffed by a Registered Nurse practitioner is located in Trustee's Hall on the main Ottumwa campus.

Extracurricular activities available include over forty clubs and organizations. A variety of organized intramural sports are offered. Students interested in the performing arts can participate in school-sponsored theater productions, the Camerata Singers, the IHCC Jazz band or the Warrior Basketball band. Those with interest in the written word may participate in a variety of poetry readings through the academic year and submit their own work for publication in the Hills Review: The Journal of Student Poetry.

Notable people 

 Tom Arnold, actor/comedian
 Kenny Bednarek, professional track and field sprinter 
 Ernest Brown, former NBA guard for the Miami Heat
 C. J. Bruton, former NBA and NBL guard
 Dwight Buycks, professional basketball player who plays for Oklahoma City Blue
 LaRon Dendy, professional basketball player who currently plays for BC Ferro-ZNTU
 Irving Falú, professional baseball player for the Cincinnati Reds organization
 Ali Farokhmanesh, retired professional basketball player
 Tony Galbreath, former NFL Running back/Wide receiver for the New Orleans Saints, New York Giants and Minnesota Vikings
 Rubén Gotay, former professional baseball player
 Dwight Hardy, professional basketball player who currently plays for Trabzonspor
 Cory Hightower, former NBA guard
 Dustin Hogue, basketball player
 Riley "Brock" Kjeldgaard, first baseman who currently plays for the Lancaster Barnstormers
 Duane Kuiper, MLB second baseman for the Cleveland Indians and San Francisco Giants; older brother of Glen (shown directly below)
 Glen Kuiper, MLB broadcaster for the Oakland Athletics; younger brother of Duane (shown directly above)
 Jonathan Mathews, former coach for the San Diego Padres; son of Rick (shown directly below)
 Rick Mathews, former bullpen coach for the Colorado Rockies; father of Jonathan (shown directly above)
 Pete Mickeal, former ABA league MVP and International basketball player
 Eric Rasmussen, former professional baseball player
 Shane Rawley, former professional baseball player
 Marcus Relphorde (born 1988), basketball player in the Israeli National League
 Kevin Ritz, former Major League Baseball pitcher for the Detroit Tigers
 Orlando Román, professional baseball player who plays for the Tokyo Yakult Swallows
 Johnny Taylor, NBA and International basketball player
 Rick Upchurch, former NFL Wide receiver for the Denver Broncos
 Ramón Vázquez, retired Major League Baseball infielder
 Jeff Zimmerman, former professional baseball player

References

External links 
 Official website
 Indian Hills Athletics

 
Education in Appanoose County, Iowa
Education in Wapello County, Iowa
Buildings and structures in Ottumwa, Iowa
Community colleges in Iowa
NJCAA athletics
Centerville, Iowa
1966 establishments in Iowa
Educational institutions established in 1966